This is a list of Harlequin Romance novels released in 2013.

Releases 
{| class="wikitable sortable"
|-
! Number !! Title !! Author !! Date/Year released
|-
| #4357 || The Heir's Proposal || Raye Morgan || January, 2013
|-
| #4358 || The Soldier's Sweetheart || Soraya Lane || January, 2013
|-
| #4359 || The Billionaire's Fair Lady || Barbara Wallace || January, 2013
|-
| #4360 || A Bride For The Maverick Millionaire || Marion Lennox || January, 2013
|-
| #4361 || Shipwrecked with Mr. Wrong || Nikki Logan || January 2013
|-
| #4362 || When Chocolate Is Not Enough || Nina Harrington || January, 2013
|-
| #4363 || Her Rocky Mountain Protector || Patricia Thayer || February, 2013
|-
| #4364 || The Billionaire's Baby S.O.S. || Susan Meier || February, 2013
|-
| #4365 || Baby Out Of The Blue || Rebecca Winters || February, 2013
|-
| #4366 || Balroom To Bride And Groom || Kate Hardy ||February, 2013
|-
| #4367 || Guardian To The Heiress || Margaret Way || March, 2013
|-
| #4368 || Little Cowgirl On His Doorstep || Donna Alward || March, 2013
|-
| #4369 || Mission: Soldier To Daddy || Soraya Lane ||March, 2013
|-
| #4370 || Winning Back His Wife || Melissa McClone || March, 2013
|-
| #4371 || Sparks Fly With The Billionaire || Marion Lennox || April, 2013
|-
| #4372 || A Daddy For Her Sons || Raye Morgan || April, 2013
|-
| #4373 || Along Came Twins... || Rebecca Winters || April, 2013
|-
| #4374 || An Accidental Family || Ami Weaver || April, 2013
|-
| #4375 || A Father For Her Triplets || Susan Meier || May, 2013
|-
| #4376 || The Matchmaker's Happy Ending || Shirley Jump || May, 2013
|-
| #4377 || Second Chance With The Rebel || Cara Colter || May, 2013
|-
| #4378 || First Come Baby... || Michelle Douglas || May, 2013
|-
| #4379 || The Making Of A Princess || Teresa Carpenter || June, 2013
|-
| #4380 || Marriage For Her Baby || Raye Morgan || June, 2013
|-
| #4381 || The Man Behind The Pinstripes || Melissa McClone || June, 2013
|-
| #4382 || Falling For The Rebel Falcon || Lucy Gordon || June, 2013
|-
| #4383 || A Cowboy To Come Home || Donna Alward || July, 2013
|-
| #4384 || How To Melt A Frozen Heart || Cara Colter || July, 2013
|-
| #4385 || The Cattleman's Ready-Made Family || Michelle Douglas || July, 2013
|-
| #4386 || Rancher To The Rescue || Jennifer Faye || July, 2013
|-
| #4387 || The Cowboy She Couldn't Forget || Patricia Thayer || August, 2013
|-
| #4388 || A Marriage Made In Italy || Rebecca Winters || August, 2013
|-
| #4389 || Miracle In Bellaroo Creek || Barbara Hannay || August, 2013
|-
| #4390 || The Courage To Say Yes || Barbara Wallace || August, 2013
|-
| #4391 || Bound By A Baby || Kate Hardy || September, 2013
|-
| #4392 || In The Line Of Duty || Ami Weaver || September, 2013
|-
| #4393 || Patchwork Family In The Outback || Soraya Lane || September, 2013
|-
| #4394 || Stranded With The Tycoon || Sophie Pembroke || September, 2013
|-
| #4395 || Single Dad's Christmas Miracle || Susan Meier || October, 2013
|-
| #4396 || Snowbound With The Soldier || Jennifer Faye || October, 2013
|-
| #4397 || The Redemption Of Rico D'Angelo || Michelle Douglas || October, 2013
|-
| #4398 || The Christmas Baby Surprise || Shirley Jump || October, 2013
|-
| #4399 || Proposal At The Lazy S Rancher || Patricia Thayer || November, 2013
|-
| #4400 || A Little Bit Of Holiday Magic || Melissa McClone || November, 2013
|-
| #4401 || A Cadence Creek Christmas || Donna Alward || November, 2013
|-
| #4402 || Marry Me Under Mistletoe || Rebecca Winters || November, 2013
|-
| #4403 || Second Chance With Her Soldier || Barbara Hannay || December, 2013
|-
| #4404 || Snowed With The Billionaire || Caroline Anderson || December, 2013
|-
| #4405 || Christmas At The Castle || Marion Lennox || December, 2013
|-
| #4406 || Snowflakes And Silver Linings || Cara Colter || December, 2013

Lists of Harlequin Romance novels
2013 novels